Book censorship in the People's Republic of China (PRC) is implemented or mandated by the PRC's unique ruling party, the Chinese Communist Party (CCP), and is currently widespread in China. Enforcement is strict and sometimes inconsistent. Punishment for violations can be arbitrary many times leading to long sentences for crimes against censorship laws.

The CCP and the government have historically been sensitive to any opinions on the politics and history of China and its leaders that differ from currently sanctioned opinions.

In the 2010s, book censorship spread from mainland China to Hong Kong. The CCP's handling of the censorship of media and literature has been scrutinized by countries and groups around the world. The CCP's actions have also resulted in actions of defiance in Mainland China, Hong Kong, and Taiwan.

History 
Book censorship has been a method used by China since the start of the Qin dynasty (221 to 206 BC). Both domestic and foreign books which do not meet the central government's requirement will be censored and forbidden to be published.

Qin Shi Huang 
In the 213 BCE, ancient China allegedly conducted a book censorship movement called "burning of books and burying of scholars".

Aisin Gioro Hongli 
In the 18th century Qing dynasty, the Qianlong Emperor, Aisin Gioro Hongli, (reigned 1735–1796) asked his officials to censor books published in the 17th century which contained any anti-dynastic or heterodox thoughts. All these books had to be burned in order to avoid having a negative impact on the next generation's thoughts.

Mao Zedong 
In the 20th century with the rise of the CCP Chairman Mao Zedong (March 20, 1943 – September 9, 1976) introduced many new laws concerning censorship in China. In his paper, “The Value of Intellectual Freedom in Twenty-First-Century China: Changes, Challenges, and Progress”, Raymond Pun, a professor and researcher at the Alder Graduate School of Education, states that the CCP “maintained a political censorship that can be understood in three ways: ‘to retain power, to maintain community standards and to protect dogma-in this case, Maoist dogma””. This dogma began immediately after 1949 culminated in the 1950s and a period called the Cultural Revolution, in which books identified as anti-Communist and Maoist were censored and banned.  During this time, public book burnings also became a tool to destroy all material not deemed appropriate by the CCP. By the end of the Cultural Revolution, only a few books were deemed acceptable by the CCP, including classic works by Karl Marx, Friedrich Engels, Vladimir Lenin, and Joseph Stalin, books written by Mao Zedong and Lu Xun, a few political readings, and Revolutionary opera books. Books beyond this scope were all banned from selling and borrowing. In 1971, there were only 46 state-owned publishing houses. Students who wanted to see these censored books circulated handwritten, string-bound copies among their classmates.

Xi Jinping 
Like Mao Zedong, Xi Jinping has continued many of the practices put in place to censor media and literature by the Cultural Revolution. Xi Jinping (November 15, 2012 - present), current CCP General Secretary, has continued to ban books in mainland China and Hong Kong that are considered “politically incorrect”. Like Mao, Xi has specifically targeted libraries to censor pro-democracy books and textbooks used in schools, all to promote “patriotism and ideological purity in the education system”.

In 2019, Xi Jinping came under fire for resuming the practice of burning books, when a library was caught by the local press burning books in North Western China. Laws put in place by Xi's Ministry of Education gave libraries permission to “cleanse” books that promoted “incorrect global outlook and values,” leading to book burnings around China.

Mainland China 
As well as censoring the publication of such books within China and encouraging self censorship, the importation and dissemination of such material is often severely punished and circulation by the way of online files is strictly controlled. Over time China has banned dozens of books, all with their own reasons. (see below in the List of banned books section). Book types that are typically banned are as follows: Books about Chinese modern politics, biographies of former leaders. Books about the lives of or allegations concerning current leaders - these are particularly sensitive topics. Books concerning Tibet and Xinjiang that do less than fully endorse that these have always and will always be part of China. Books about the Dalai Lama, about the 1989 Tiananmen Square protests and massacre or the events of the Cultural Revolution. Books about the Falun Gong religious movement, and other religious books which may contradict government endorsed theology, including some editions of the Holy Bible. Books of allegorical fiction that obliquely criticize the Chinese government.

Censorship in Mainland China also extends from political topics into social taboos. The CCP has made strict regulations on books that have explicit descriptions of sex, like extramarital sex.

China's state-run General Administration of Press and Publication (新闻出版总署) (GAPP) screens all Chinese literature that is intended to be sold on the open market. The GAPP has the legal authority to screen, censor, and ban any print, electronic, or Internet publication in China. Because all publishers in China are required to be licensed by the GAPP, that agency also has the power to deny people the right to publish, and completely shut down any publisher who fails to follow its dictates. Consequently, the ratio of official-to-unlicensed books is said to be 40%:60%. According to a report in ZonaEuropa, there are more than 4,000 underground publishing factories around China. The Chinese government continues to hold public book burnings on unapproved literature or books that have since fallen out of favor with CCP elites though critics claim this spotlight on individual titles only helps fuel book sales.

Some banned books are available in limited circulation to CCP leaders, so they can better understand the outside world. These books are marked as for internal use (內部) i.e. within the party only.

The PRC has also tried to follow the Soviet model, by introducing state-run publishing houses for books to keep a tight hold on what can and cannot be shown to the public. This model forces publishing houses to get approval from the PRC's government before publication, making publication a long and arduous process for the publisher, further restricting the flow of information.

Even though the book censorship is widespread across mainland China, censorship is a negotiable process. In 2019, Amy Hawkins and Jeffrey Wasserstrom of The Atlantic claimed that authorities no longer had as much of a focus on censoring books as a declining number of people read, and that there is more concern for censoring products for mass consumption. They stated this explains why the book versions of Animal Farm and Nineteen Eighty-Four are available in Mainland China, but added that all references to Mao Zedong have been removed from Nineteen Eighty-Four.

In 2020, Edmund Burke's Reflections on the Revolution in France was censored along with works by conservative writers such as Albert Jay Nock, James Stephen, Joseph de Maistre, Richard M. Weaver, William F. Buckley Jr., Russell Kirk, and Mario Vargas Llosa. Thomas Piketty's book Capital and Ideology was censored in China for analyzing inequality in the country.

In 2021, the Ministry of Education of the People's Republic of China announced a ban on books in school libraries that engage in "Western veneration".

Hong Kong

Compared with the mainland China, publishing in Hong Kong historically remained less censored. Publishers such as New Century Press freely publish books, including lurid fictional accounts, about Chinese officials and forbidden episodes of Chinese history. Banned material including imported material such as that published by Mirror Books of New York City are sold in bookshops such as "People’s Commune bookstore" patronized by shoppers from the mainland. Nowadays, as more and more mainland tourists travel to Hong Kong, the central government tends to have a greater control over the book publication. There are more book store closures and less willing publishers. Bookshops in Hong Kong have been making changes of what they sell and those books generally have less coverage over political, religious, and other sensitive issues disliked by the central government. This can be regarded as a kind of self-censorship or soft censorship. In 2018, some Hong Kong booksellers who trafficked banned books were found missing. Some independent publishers in Hong Kong who sell politically sensitive books hide those forbidden books behind a counter or rent their bookstores on higher floors in some commercial buildings where few people know them. After the passage of the Hong Kong national security law in 2020, libraries began removing sensitive books.

Over time, people have found different ways to reintroduce banned books into Hong Kong. One of the most famous examples is the Hong Kong book fair, in which thousands of Hong Kong, Mainland, and Taiwanese citizens come to buy censored books unattainable in Mainland China.

Responses to banned books 

In 2015, 12 American publishers, including Penguin Random House, Macmillan Publishers, and W. W. Norton & Company, signed a pledge to oppose the Chinese government's censorship targeting foreign authors' works. Many foreign authors found that some of their books' content had been removed, without their knowledge, during its translation into Chinese. Some authors did not fully understand how Chinese censorship actually worked, so they just signed contracts stating the insurance of their original content without double-checking whether the translated version had any changes to content. Most expurgated content was related to political sensitivities or political incorrectness.

In 2017, publishers at a book fair held in Beijing needed to exercise self-censorship by avoiding selling books related with sensitive topics, such as 1989 Tiananmen Square protests, Tibetan sovereignty debate and political status of Taiwan so as to adapt to one of the largest book publishing markets in the world. In the same year, the Chinese government asked Cambridge University Press to block online access to more than 300 articles which contained political sensitivities from The China Quarterly. Many scholars signed a petition to call upon Cambridge University Press to oppose against the Chinese government's censorship request so as to ensure academic and publication freedom. The Chinese government has also imposed restrictions on the access to foreign children's books since they believed that children should be more in touch with books reflecting Chinese values.

In 2018, the editors of the Transcultural Research Book Series ended their cooperation with Springer Nature which imposed restrictions on access to more than 1,000 political science journal articles in China. If the content books or journals do not fit the Propaganda Department of the Chinese Communist Party's agenda, those books will be banned from publication and selling.

Countries have responded in different ways to the CCP's censorship efforts. In January 2018, the Swedish government issued multiple statements regarding the disappearance of a Swedish book publisher, Gui Minhai, in China. NPR reported on Sweden's response to China, where a back and forth between the two countries concerning the freedom of the Swedish publisher ensued.

Many organizations around the world have also come out with statements against the CCP's actions. In 2018, Summer Lopez, senior director at PEN America (an organization focused on the protection of the freedom of speech), came out with a statement concerning the CCP's actions with Gui Minhai, stating that “China's treatment of publisher Gui Minhai — a story of abduction, detention, and now denial of medical care — demonstrates flagrant disregard for the rule of law and human rights”.

With pressure on Taiwanese book publishers from the CCP's government, many have turned towards self censorship just like in Hong Kong, removing all materials concerning vulgar or politically detrimental content. Taiwanese books which are about democracy, protests and human rights are blacklisted in China.

List of censored books

See also
Censorship in China
List of books banned by governments

References

 
210s BC establishments
3rd-century BC establishments in China